Gytsjerk is a village in Tytsjerksteradiel in the province of Friesland, the Netherlands. It had a population of around 2,300 in 2018.

History
The village was first mentioned in 1439 as Gheszerka, and means "church of Gye (person)". Gytsjerk developed in the middle ages on a sandy ridge. Later, a linear settlement appeared further westwards along the Leeuwarden to Dokkum. The Protestant church was built at the end of the 12th century and was enlarged in the early-16th century. The tower dates from the early-19th century.

Gytsjerk was home to 336 people in 1840. The cooperative dairy factory Trynwâlden was constructed in 1896. It was enlarged and renovated in 1921 and a laboratory was added. From the 1960s onwards, it started to become a suburb of Leeuwarden. Between 2016 and 2017, the shopping mall was demolished and replaced by a new shopping mall.

Notable buildings
 The Protestant church of Gytsjerk

Gallery

References

Populated places in Friesland
Tytsjerksteradiel